Pierce Township may refer to the following places in the United States:

 Pierce Township, DeKalb County, Illinois
 Pierce Township, Washington County, Indiana
 Pierce Township, Page County, Iowa
 Pierce Township, Texas County, Missouri
 Pierce Township, Stone County, Missouri
 Pierce Township, Lawrence County, Missouri
 Pierce Township, Barnes County, North Dakota
 Pierce Township, Clermont County, Ohio

See also
 Piercetown (disambiguation)

Township name disambiguation pages